Breedy's is a village in the parish of Saint Andrew in Barbados.

Populated places in Barbados
Saint Andrew, Barbados